Giada Valenti  is an Italian singer, born in Portogruaro, Venice, in 1976. Valenti started singing and playing piano at age seven. She studied music theory and piano at Santa Cecilia and got her music degree at G. Tartini in Trieste.

Since 2004, Giada Valenti has been living in New York City. She performs regularly in various theatres, festivals, clubs and has also performed at the Columbus Day parade in New York City. In 2005 she self-released her first CD, Italian Signorina. Her second CD, And I Love You So, was released in 2008. In 2009  Valenti presented a new show, Tribute to love, at Hotel Hilton Casino & Resort, which was sold out. In 2010, Valenti performed in Broadway with a new show   called An Evening with Giada Valenti, singing love songs of the 1960s, 1970s and 1980s.

Before moving to New York City Valenti got a job offer to sing in a trio in Switzerland. While she was in Amsterdam she was selected  for a contest, the San Remo Giovani Talenti nel Mondo, a contest for Italian residents in foreign countries and she represented the Netherlands. She won with the song, Solo con te, in the song writers category. After that BMG Ariola Holland offered her a contract. She released her first CD in 2000 under her real name. She changed her name to Giada Valenti in 2004 when she moved to New York City. One of the singles  from her CD, Cristina Parliamo d'amore, was selected for a scooter advertisement in the Netherlands and Belgium.
Valenti had her debut with PBS in September 2015  Her new cd-dvd From Venice With Love, was released in 2016 features top-notch production credits including arranger Chris Walden, Larry Gold, multi-Grammy Award-winning music producer Gregg Field, television director Alex Coletti, and lighting designer Chris Landy

References

Musicians from the Metropolitan City of Venice
Italian women singers
Living people
Year of birth missing (living people)
People from Portogruaro